Panter Ridge is a solitary ridge 0.5 nautical miles (0.9 km) long in the south part of Kyle Hills, Ross Island. The feature rises to 800 m between Slattery Peak and Detrick Peak. At the suggestion of P.R. Kyle, named by Advisory Committee on Antarctic Names (US-ACAN) (2000) after Kurt S. Panter, who, as a Ph.D. student at New Mexico Institute of Mining and Technology, worked extensively in Marie Byrd Land where he completed his dissertation on rocks from Mount Sidley; also assisted with work on Mount Erebus in five field seasons, 1988–96.

Ridges of Ross Island